RCAF Station Yorkton was a Second World War air training station located near Yorkton, Saskatchewan, Canada.

History

World War II
The Royal Canadian Air Force (RCAF), opened No. 11 Service Flying Training School (SFTS) at RCAF Station Yorkton on 10 April 1941. No. 11 SFTS was closed on 1 December 1944 and the following month No. 23 Elementary Flying Training School (EFTS) was relocated to Yorkton from RCAF Station Davidson on 29 January 1945.  No. 23 EFTS was closed 15 August 1945. The schools and station were a component of the British Commonwealth Air Training Plan. The station was decommissioned shortly thereafter.

Construction of the station began in 1940. The facility was opened on June 11, 1941, and the first commander was Group Captain George R. Howsam. The school consisted of 40 buildings, including a mess hall, a 35-bed hospital, and hangars to shelter 200 planes.

Aerodrome information 
The airfield was constructed in a typical BCATP wartime pattern, with six runways formed in an overlaid triangle. The aerodrome in Yorkton, however, had two additional runways running roughly north–south on the east side of the overlaid triangle.

Eight runways were listed as follows:

Relief landing field – Sturdee
The primary Relief Landing Field (R1) for RCAF Station Yorkton was located approximately 6 miles south-east. The site was located approximately 1 mile south of the unincorporated community of Calley, Saskatchewan.  The Relief field was laid out in the standard triangular pattern. 

Three runways were listed as follows:

A review of Google Maps on 11 June 2018 shows a clear outline of a triangular aerodrome about 1/2 a mile south of the posted coordinates.

Relief landing field – Rhein
The secondary Relief Landing Field (R2) for RCAF Station Yorkton was located approximately 12 miles north-east. The site was located approximately 3.5 miles south of the community of Rhein, Saskatchewan.  The Relief field was turf with a triangular runway layout. 

Three runways were listed as follows:

A review of Google Maps on 11 June 2018 shows no identifiable trace of the former aerodrome in the vicinity of the posted coordinates.

Post-war

Current status
From a survey of the location on Google Maps on 11 June 2018 it appears that all but two of the original eight runways have been removed. One of the 3/21 runways has been lengthened. One of the 12/30 runways is still in use but is listed as gravel/asphalt. The airport is currently operated at the Yorkton Municipal Airport.

See also
Yorkton, Saskatchewan
Yorkton Municipal Airport

References

External links
Bruce Forsyth's Canadian Military History Page

Yorkton
Military airbases in Saskatchewan
Yorkton
Military history of Saskatchewan
Military installations closed in 1945
1941 establishments in Saskatchewan
1945 disestablishments in Canada